The Communist Party of the Free Territory of Trieste (PCTLT; , KPSTO) was a communist party in the Free Territory of Trieste. It was founded at a congress in 1945 by a merger of the local branches of the Italian Communist Party and the Communist Party of Slovenia as the Communist Party of the Julian Region (Partito Comunista della Regione Giuliana, PCRG, Komunistična partija Julijske krajine, KPJK). The party published a daily newspaper, Il Lavoratore.

History

Initial period
At the time of its foundation, the party favoured integration of the area with Yugoslavia. This stood in contrast with the line of the Italian Communist Party and its leader Palmiro Togliatti, which opposed Yugoslav claims to the region. The main leaders of the party were Rudi Uršič and the Yugoslav partisan leader Branko Babič.

In 1947, when the Free Territory was formally constituted, the party adopted the name PCTLT/KPSTO.

Tito-Cominform split
The party suffered a split following the 28 June 1948 resolution of Cominform, resulting in the expulsion of the Communist Party of Yugoslavia. The pro-Yugoslavia wing was led by Branko Babič, and the pro-Cominform wing was led by former Comintern agent Vittorio Vidali. The pro-Cominform wing was able to retain a majority in the Central Committee (6 against 4), and Vidali became the leader of the party. Under Vidali's leadership the party began opposing the annexation of the Free Territory by Yugoslavia.

The pro-Yugoslav minority was largely composed of Slovenian cadres. They formed a separate PCTLT under the leadership of Babič. The pro-Yugoslav minority then regrouped as the Italian-Slovenian Popular Front (FPIS).

Although initially present in both the British-U.S.-controlled Zone A and the Yugoslavian-controlled Zone B, the PCTLT led by Vidali was suppressed in Zone B after the split. The FPIS took part in FTT elections in Zone A and continued to function after the integration of Zone A into Italy.

1949 election

The PCTLT took part in the June 12, 1949 elections in the Free Territory. It obtained 35,568 votes (approximately 20% of the total vote), and 13 seats. In the same election, the pro-Yugoslav communists obtained one seat. In the rigged so-called "popular" election of the Zone B in 1950, the FPIS was largely majoritarian instead.

Ethnic composition
PCTLT was the sole pluriethnical political force in the Free Territory at the time, with a large following amongst both Italian and Slovenian workers. It ran a separate Slovenian-language organ, Delo.

Youth wing
The youth wing of the party was known as the Communist Youth Federation of the Free State of Trieste (Federazione Giovanile Comunista del Territorio Libero di Trieste). FGCTLT published Gioventù. There was also an Anti-Fascist Youth Union of the Free Territory of Trieste, closely linked to the FGCTLT.

Integration into PCI
After the Zone A was integrated into Italy in 1954, the party merged into the Italian Communist Party (PCI) in 1957. Within the PCI, the Trieste communists had a Triestian Autonomous Federation.

References

Political parties in the Free Territory of Trieste
Communist parties in Europe
History of Trieste
Italy–Yugoslavia relations
Political parties established in 1947
Political parties disestablished in 1954